Riverview, Florida, may refer to:

 Riverview, Florida, a census-designated place in Hillsborough County
 Riverview, Duval County, Florida, a neighborhood in Jacksonville
 Riverview, Escambia County, Florida, a location in Escambia County

See also  
 Riverview (disambiguation)

es:Riverview (Florida)